Ryan Astley (born 4 October 2001) is a Welsh professional footballer who plays for Accrington Stanley, on loan from Everton, as a defender.

Early life
Astley is from Llanfair Caereinion.

Club career
Astley began his career with Everton, making his debut for their under-23 team at the age of 16 in 2018, before being offered a new contract in April 2021. He was an unused substitute for their FA Cup match against Boreham Wood in March 2022. Astley moved to Accrington Stanley on loan from Everton in July 2022, and made his professional debut on 6 August 2022, appearing as a substitute.

International career
Astley is a Wales youth international. He has captained the under-21 team, and has trained with the under-23 team.

Honours 
Everton U23s

 Premier League Cup: 2018–19

References

2001 births
Living people
Welsh footballers
Everton F.C. players
Accrington Stanley F.C. players
English Football League players
Association football defenders
Wales youth international footballers
Wales under-21 international footballers